The Fen Complex in Nome, Telemark, Norway is a region noted for an unusual suite of igneous rocks. Several varieties of carbonatite are present in the area as well as lamprophyre, ijolite and other highly alkalic rocks. It is the type locality for fenite, a metasomatic rock commonly found around carbonatite and alkali intrusives.

The Fen Complex is a roughly circular area about three kilometres in diameter. It is located just west of the Oslo graben. Radiometric age dating on the carbonatites gave an age of 539 +/- 14 Myr. The host rocks for the intrusions are middle Proterozoic granites and gneiss and the complex was associated with the Cambrian rifting of the cratonic rocks.

The complex is a protected location because of the rare minerals and rock types found there. The rocks were first described by Waldemar Christofer Brøgger in 1921.

See also
Alnö Complex
Kattsund-Koster dyke swarm
Kola Alkaline Province
Norra Kärr
Särna alkaline complex

References

Carbonatite occurrences
Geography of Telemark
Petrology
Geology of Norway
Cambrian magmatism